Callispa krishnashunda, is a species of leaf beetle found in Sri Lanka.

Description
Body length is about 5.75 mm. Body broad, oblong and yellowish brown in color. Eyes medium-sized. Antennae dark brown and about 2.25 mm long. Prothorax is about 1.10 mm long and medially truncate anterior margin with a transverse row of punctures. Scutellum sub-pentagonal. Elytral length is about 4.50 mm. There are ten rows of punctures at each elytron base. Small and brownish hind wings with a total length of about 6.00 mm. Legs with both fore-coxae and mid-coxae are punctured.

References 

Cassidinae
Insects of Sri Lanka
Beetles described in 1919